Anwan may refer to:

Anwan, Iran, a village in Qazvin Province
Anwan Glover, American actor and musician